The People's Train is a 2009 novel by Australian novelist Tom Keneally.

Plot summary

The novel is a fictionalised account of the Australian life of Fyodor Sergeyev, given in the book as Artem Samsurov, a Russian émigré to Australia who would later play a significant role in Lenin's government.

Reviews
 The Guardian
 The Telegraph

Awards and nominations

 2010 shortlisted Commonwealth Writers' Prize South East Asia and South Pacific Region — Best Book 
 2010 longlisted Miles Franklin Literary Award

References

External links
 The author discussed the novel on Random Book Talk Random Book Talk

2009 Australian novels
Novels by Thomas Keneally